Clapham Common is a London Underground station in Clapham within the London Borough of Lambeth. It is on the Northern line, between Clapham North and Clapham South stations, and is in Travelcard Zone 2.

History

The station is at the eastern tip of Clapham Common and was opened on 3 June 1900 as the new southern terminus of the City & South London Railway, which was extended from Stockwell. It remained the terminus until the Morden extension was opened on 13 September 1926.

The station today

The station has two entrances, one at the west via a domed building dating from the 1920s, and one at the east via a modern curved-steel and glass pavilion.

Clapham Common is one of two remaining deep-level stations on the underground that has an island platform in tunnel serving both the northbound and southbound lines, the other being Clapham North.

Clapham Common is one of eight London Underground stations that have a deep-level air-raid shelter underneath them. Both entrances to the shelter are north of the station on Clapham High Street.

Services
Train frequencies vary throughout the day, but generally operate every 2–6 minutes between 06:09 and 00:21 in both directions.

Connections
London Buses routes 35, 37, 50, 88, 137, 155, 249, 322, 345, 417, and night routes N137 and N155 serve the station.

Advertising
For 2 weeks in September 2016, all of the adverts used in the station were replaced by photos of cats. This was an initiative paid for on crowdfunding site Kickstarter and organized by an organisation called The Citizens Advertising Takeover Service (C.A.T.S).

In January 2017, as part of the initiative Veganuary, PETA took over the station informing and encouraging commuters to adopt veganism for the month.

References

External links

 Station in 1925

Northern line stations
Tube stations in the London Borough of Lambeth
Former City and South London Railway stations
Railway stations in Great Britain opened in 1900
Charles Holden railway stations
Clapham
Domes
London Underground Night Tube stations
Grade II listed buildings in the London Borough of Lambeth